The chieftaincy institution in Ghana is a system that structures and regulates the activity of local chieftains (or monarchs) in the Ghanaian society and state.

Paper and legislation
In pre-colonial times, leadership was the axis of executive, legislative and judicial powers. Since the colonial era, the institution has been linked to Ghanaian politics. Several governments - the colonial, civilian, or military - have attempted, in one way or another, to influence the role of chiefs in political affairs.
The legislation that underpins the chieftaincy institution in Ghana currently is itself Ghana's constitution (chapter 270–277) and the chieftaincy act of 2008.

Categories of chiefs
The chiefs are divided by the act of leadership into 5 categories (as for authority):

 Paramount Chiefs or Monarchs
 Divisional Chiefs
 Sub-divisional Chiefs
 Adikrofo, and
 Other minor Chiefs not falling within any of the preceding categories as are recognised by the Regional House of Chiefs.

This popular hierarchy system informally divides chiefs between royalty and nobility, using the European comparative scale of equivalence:

Royalty
They are the monarchs proper, who prevailed before colonization with sovereignty or complete autonomy (depending on the primacy). We can divide in:
 Emperor: The leader of a whole ethnic group, usually referred to only as a king, but acting as "king of kings". It consists of a Chief Paramount Chief who has a primacy (currently only ceremonial) over all other chiefs of his ethnic group. One example is the Ashanti people who are led by the chief of Kumasi. Another example is the Dagbon People led by the Yaa Naa, Ewe Fiaga, chief of all Ewe and based in Notsie, in turn, located in the Republic of Togo.
 King: The paramount chief leads a traditional area, which can range from a grouping of towns and villages to a sub-ethnic group. He is always the chief (prince) of the capital of a traditional area and by his primacy is the chairman of the traditional council of his area. He is always present when a subordinate prince is installed.
 Prince: The division chief is the base ruler of the system and is equated with a sovereign prince. The primary determinant of whether he will be a supreme chief (king or emperor) or not will be the size, relevance, and antiquity of the community (city, village group, or village) that he governs, as well as matriarchial lineage. His function is similar to that of a hereditary mayor, since the basic unit of elective Ghana is the district.

Nobility
The primary difference between the nobility and traditional royalty is the "stools" which the latter possess, that is, the thrones. Just as royal titles are very diverse and vary from ethnicity to ethnicity, so too are those of nobles, but when comparing them to the basic categories of the Western European standard we have:
 Duke / Marquis: Development King or Chief: This is an honorific title, which is received by the installation ceremony and its protocol is similar to that of the royal chiefs, which makes him somewhat equivalent to the duke, who in turn in the West is the noble that most approaches the position of the prince. They are granted by each divisional chief (as a fons honorum) with the aim of seeking sponsors for his community. The title is a recent one in Ghana, and has been criticized for the confusion of its bearers with traditional kings. Often, those who receive it do not honor their commitment to development.
 Head of Clan: Similar to the Scottish nobility the head of a sub-division is known as a clan chief within the traditional community. Sometimes, they are part of a divisional council.
 Lord: The Adikrofo (a title that can vary from region to region) is the base of the system, without a city or class to lead but respected and at the service of every community.

Chivalry
A relatively new phenomenon has been observed in Ghana, as in other parts of Africa. Dynastic orders related to the royal chiefs and their lineages have begun to appear. Some examples:
 Royal Order of the Lion of Godenu
 Royal Order of the Elephant of Godenu
 Royal Order of the Golden Fire Dog
 Royal Order of the Golden Leopard 
 Royal Order of Kwakyen Ababio

These, on the one hand, have been an alternative to the banalization of the development chief category, but have themselves been criticized by certain conservative monarchists for not respecting the tradition of cavalry not belonging to the traditions of most of Africa, although few question reigning kings right to reformulate and create honors at will.

Notable chiefs

Paramount
 Osei Tutu II
 Togbe Afede XIV
 Gariba II
 Nene Klagbodjor Animle V
 Osagyefo Nana Amanfo Edu VI
 Naba Asigri Abugrago Azoka II

Divisional
 Togbe Osei III
 Oheneba Nana Kwame Obeng II
 Nana Kwasi Suamena II
 Nana Òkofrobòur Ababio II 
 Nana Kojo Kurentsir X

Development
 Bob Geldof
 LisaRaye McCoy
 Nana YAW AMOAKO (Richard) -The Nkosohene of Atwima Apemanim enstooled on 31/01/1993 by Nana Okofo Gyansah II (The warior of Ashanti). Nana Amoako is also a Councillor in Belgium

See also
 Akan chieftaincy
 Kingdom of Dagbon
 National House of Chiefs

References

External links
 http://nhoc.gov.gh/

Politics of Ghana
Tribal chiefs
African nobility